Sherman Everett Burroughs (February 6, 1870 – January 27, 1923) was an American politician and a U.S. Representative from New Hampshire.

Early life
Burroughs was born on February 6, 1870 in Dunbarton, New Hampshire. He attended the public schools, and was graduated from Dartmouth College, Hanover, in 1894.

Career
Burroughs was private secretary to Congressman Henry M. Baker from 1894 to 1897. He was graduated from the law school of Columbian College (now George Washington University), Washington, D.C., in 1896. He was admitted to the Washington, D.C. bar in 1896 and the New Hampshire bar in 1897. Burroughs commenced practice in Manchester, New Hampshire, in 1897.

A member of the New Hampshire House of Representatives representing Bow, New Hampshire Burroughs served in 1901 and 1902.  He was a member of the State board of charities and corrections, 1901–1907, and a member of the State board of equalization in 1909 and 1910.

Elected as a Republican to the Sixty-fifth Congress in a special election, to fill the vacancy caused by the death of United States Representative Cyrus A. Sulloway, Burroughs was reelected to the two succeeding Congresses and served from (May 29, 1917 – January 27, 1923). He didn't run for reelection to the Sixty-eighth Congress in 1922, and died in office.

Death
Burroughs died in Washington, D.C., on January 27, 1923, ten days before his 53rd birthday and reportedly of congestion of the lungs caused by "an illness with the grippe and is interred at Pine Grove Cemetery in Manchester, New Hampshire.

Family life
Son of John H. Burroughs and Helen M. Baker, Burroughs married Helen Sophie Phillips in 1898 and they had four sons, Sherman Everett Jr., John Hamilton, Robert Phillips Burroughs, and Henry Baker.

See also
List of United States Congress members who died in office (1900–49)

References

External links

 

Sherman E. Burroughs, late a representative

1870 births
1923 deaths
Dartmouth College alumni
George Washington University Law School alumni
Republican Party members of the New Hampshire House of Representatives
New Hampshire lawyers
Republican Party members of the United States House of Representatives from New Hampshire
People from Dunbarton, New Hampshire